This is a list of British television related events from 1948.

Events

January
5 January – Television Newsreel is first shown on the BBC Television Service.

February–June
No events.

July
29 July – The BBC Television Service begins its coverage of the Olympic Games in London by broadcasting the opening ceremony. From now until the closing ceremony on 14 August the BBC Television Service will broadcast an average three and a half hours a day of live coverage from the Games, using a special coaxial cable linking the main venue at Wembley Stadium to the television service's base at Alexandra Palace. This is the most ambitious sustained outside broadcast yet attempted by the BBC, but passes off with no serious problems.

August–December
No events.

Debuts
5 January – Television Newsreel (1948–1954)
8 February – Pygmalion (1948)
14 March – I Killed the Count (1948)
21 March – Men of Darkness (1948)
1 August – Kid Flanaghan (1948)
15 August – The Front Page (1948)
Unknown – Television Dancing Club (1948–1962) (Dancing Club from 1963–1964)

Continuing television shows

1920s
BBC Wimbledon (1927–1939, 1946–2019, 2021–2024)

1930s
Picture Page (1936–1939, 1946–1952)
For the Children (1937–1939, 1946–1952)
The Boat Race (1938–1939, 1946–2019)
BBC Cricket (1939, 1946–1999, 2020–2024)

1940s
Kaleidoscope (1946–1953)
Muffin the Mule (1946–1955, 2005–2006)
Café Continental (1947–1953)

Births
 2 January – Deborah Watling, actress (died 2017)
 19 January – Michael J. Jackson, actor
 24 February – Dennis Waterman, actor (died 2022)
 26 February – Roberta Taylor, actress
 10 March – Richard Park, media personality and businessman
 25 March – Lynn Faulds Wood, Scottish-born consumer affairs presenter (died 2020)
 28 March – Matthew Corbett, television presenter and comedian
 4 April – Derek Thompson, Northern Irish actor
 12 April – Jeremy Beadle, television presenter, writer and producer (died 2008)
 11 May – Pam Ferris, actress
 16 May – Judy Finnigan, television presenter
 31 May – Lynda Bellingham, actress and broadcaster (died 2014)
 18 June – Philip Jackson, actor
 8 August – Wincey Willis, broadcaster
 19 September – Jeremy Irons, actor
 27 September – Michele Dotrice, actress
 3 November – Lulu, singer and entertainer
 29 November – David Rintoul, actor
 22 December – Noel Edmonds, television presenter and executive

Deaths
 30 July — Hay Petrie, actor (born 1895)

See also
 1948 in British music
 1948 in the United Kingdom
 List of British films of 1948

References